This is a list of people who are notable due to their influence on the popularity or development of evangelical Christianity or for their professed evangelicalism.

Historical 
(This list is organized chronologically by birth)
 William Tyndale (c. 1494–1536), first published use of the term evangelical in English (1531)
 John Bunyan (1628–1688), persecuted English Puritan Baptist preacher and author of Pilgrim's Progress
 Jonathan Edwards (1703–1758), American Puritan theologian and preacher in the First Great Awakening
 John Wesley (1703–1791), English clergyman; founder of Methodism
 Charles Wesley (1707–1788), English clergyman; brother of John Wesley, hymnwriter of Methodism
 George Whitefield (1714–1770), English clergyman; early Methodist preacher and associate of John Wesley
 Isaac Backus (1724–1806), advocate of the separation of church and state
 Henry Venn (1725–1797), founder of the small, but highly influential Clapham Sect in Britain
 John Newton (1725–1807), Scottish clergyman, author of Amazing Grace
 William Cowper (1731–1800), English poet/author of numerous hymns, including "There Is a Fountain Filled with Blood"
 Francis Asbury (1745–1816), founder of the Methodist Episcopal Church
 William Wilberforce (1759–1833), worked to abolish slavery in the British Empire
 Henry Thornton (1760–1815), banker, philanthropist, reformer and Member of Parliament
 Richard Allen (1760–1831), founder of the African Methodist Episcopal (AME) denomination (1816)
 William Carey, (1761–1834) British missionary to India. Known as the "father of modern missions"
 Nathan Bangs (1778–1862), editor of the Christian Advocate, president of Wesleyan University
 Charles Grandison Finney (1792–1875), preacher in the Second Great Awakening, advocate of "New Measures"
 Henry Venn (1796–1873), grandson of Henry Venn, pioneered the basic principles of indigenous church mission theory
 Robert Murray M'Cheyne (1813–1843), Scottish preacher and minister of St Peter's, Dundee
 Joseph M. Scriven (1819–1886), Irish poet, moved to Canada and wrote What a Friend We Have in Jesus
 William Henry Green (1825–1900), chairman of the Old Testament committee for the American Standard Version (1901)
 Robert Pearsall Smith (1827–1899) and Hannah Whitall Smith (1832–1911), leaders in the Holiness movement
 William Booth (1829–1912) and Catherine Booth (1829–1890), founders of The Salvation Army.
 James Hudson Taylor (1832–1905), British missionary to China and founder of the China Inland Mission
 Charles Spurgeon (1834–1892), English Baptist preacher and advocate of Calvinism
 Dwight L. Moody (1837–1899), American evangelist, pastor and educator

Twentieth century 
(This list is organized chronologically by birth)
 Fanny Crosby (1820–1915), blind American writer of many famous hymns including "Blessed Assurance"
 Alexander Maclaren (1826-1910), Scottish Baptist minister
 Joseph Parker (1830-1902), theologian, Congregationalist minister, pastor of City Temple
 Edward McKendree Bounds, (1835-1913), American author and member of the Methodist Episcopal Church South clergy
 Phineas F. Bresee, (1838–1915), founder of the Church of the Nazarene
 Albert Benjamin Simpson, (1843–1919), preacher, writer, founder of the Christian and Missionary Alliance
 Maria Woodworth-Etter (1844–1924), was an American healing evangelist. Her ministry style served as a model for Pentecostalism.
 William Mitchell Ramsay, (1851–1939), archaeologist known for his expertise in Asia Minor
 R. A. Torrey (1856–1928), American evangelist, pastor and educator and one of the founders of modern evangelical fundamentalism 
 Oswald Thompson Allis (1856–1930), co-founder of Westminster Theological Seminary
 Robert Dick Wilson (1856–1930), linguist committed to defending the reliability of the Hebrew Bible
 Billy Sunday (1862–1935), American evangelist and proponent of Prohibition
 William Irvine (1863–1947), Scottish evangelist, founder of the Cooneyites and Two by Twos sects
 G. Campbell Morgan (1863-1945), British evangelist and pastor of Westminster Chapel
 Edward Cooney (1867–1960), evangelist and early leader of the Cooneyites and Go-Preachers sects
 Harry Ironside (1876–1951), evangelist and pastor of the Moody Church in Chicago (1930–48). 
 Karl Barth (1886–1968), leader of dialectical theology and author of Church Dogmatics
 Toyohiko Kagawa (1888-1960), Japanese evangelist and social reformer
 Aimee Semple McPherson (1890–1944), Pentecostal preacher and founder of Foursquare Church
 Sadhu Sundar Singh (1889-1929?), Indian missionary
 Clarence Bouma (1891–1962), first president of the Evangelical Theological Society
 William F. Albright (1891–1971), ceramics expert, founder of the biblical archaeology movement
 Donald Barnhouse (1895–1960), former pastor of Tenth Presbyterian Church, founder of Eternity magazine
 D.P. Thomson (1896–1974), Scottish evangelist, exponent of visitation and lay evangelism, Warden of the St Ninian's Training Centre, Crieff
 Aiden Wilson Tozer (1897–1963), preacher, author of The Pursuit of God and The Knowledge of the Holy
 Martyn Lloyd Jones (1899–1981), reformed preacher at Westminster Chapel
 Frank E. Gaebelein (1899–1983), founding headmaster of The Stony Brook School, general editor of the Expositor's Bible Commentary
 John Sung (1901-1944), Chinese evangelist 
 Frank Jenner (1903–1977), English Australian evangelist
 Bakht Singh (1903-2000), pioneer of the Indian Church movement
 Harold Ockenga (1905–1985), first president of the National Association of Evangelicals
 James Gordon Lindsay (1906–1973), revivalist preacher, author, and founder of Christ for the Nations Institute
 Carl Fredrik Wisløff (1908–2004), theologian, professor in church history, preacher in Norwegian Lutheran Mission
 William M. Branham (1909–1965), preacher and prophet, pacesetter and initiator of the Tent Revival Era of the 1940s and 1950s
 Merrill Unger (1909–1980), Old Testament professor at Dallas Theological Seminary, defender of biblical inerrancy
 F. F. Bruce (1910–1990), apologist, one of the founders of the modern evangelical understanding of the Bible
 A. A. Allen (1911–1970), was a minister with a Pentecostal ministry, associated with the "Voice of Healing" movement.
 Francis Schaeffer (1912–1984), theologian, philosopher, founder of L'Abri, author of A Christian Manifesto
 Carl F. H. Henry (1913–2003), founding editor of Christianity Today
 Robert Pierce (1914–1978), founder of World Vision and Samaritan's Purse
 Bruce M. Metzger (1914–2007), biblical scholar and translator who served on the board of the American Bible Society
 Gleason Archer (1916–2004), theologian, educator, and author
 T. L. Osborn (1923–2013), American Pentecostal evangelist, singer, author, teacher and designer.
 D. James Kennedy (1930–2007), founder of Coral Ridge Presbyterian Church and Knox Theological Seminary
 Jerry Falwell (1933–2007), founder of Liberty University and the Moral Majority
 James Montgomery Boice (1938–2000), former pastor of Tenth Presbyterian Church.
 Greg Bahnsen (1948–1995), minister, educator, apologist, and a major figure in Christian Reconstructionism

Contemporary

Bible scholars, philosophers, and theologians 

 Gregory Beale, former president of the Evangelical Theological Society
 Craig Blomberg, New Testament scholar at Denver Seminary, author of How Wide the Divide? An Evangelical and a Mormon in Conversation
 Greg Boyd, theologian, author and senior pastor of Woodland Hills Church in St. Paul, Minnesota.
 William Lane Craig, professor of philosophy at Talbot School of Theology, author of The Kalam Cosmological Argument
 Millard Erickson, former president of the Evangelical Theological Society
 Gordon D. Fee, theologian, succeeded F.F. Bruce as editor of the New International Commentary on the New Testament, author of How to Read the Bible for All its Worth (co-authored with Douglas Stuart).
 Sinclair Ferguson, former editor of Banner of Truth Trust
 John Frame, theologian noted for his work in epistemology and presuppositional apologetics, author of The Doctrine of the Knowledge of God
 Norman Geisler, co-founder of Southern Evangelical Seminary, co-author of General Introduction to the Bible
 Graeme Goldsworthy, Australian Anglican theologian
 Paula Gooder, British theologian and Canon Chancellor of St Paul's Cathedral.
 Wayne Grudem, co-founder of the Council on Biblical Manhood and Womanhood, author of Systematic Theology
 Gary Habermas, author, lecturer, and debater on the topic of the Resurrection of Jesus
 Kenneth Kitchen, Egyptologist, author of On the Reliability of the Old Testament
 Andreas Köstenberger, editor of the Journal of the Evangelical Theological Society
 Richard Longenecker, professor of New Testament at McMaster Divinity College
 John Warwick Montgomery, writer, lecturer and public debater in the field of Christian apologetics
 J. P. Moreland, professor of philosophy at Talbot School of Theology
 Nancey Murphy, professor of Christian philosophy, author, and ordained minister.
 Thomas C. Oden, father of Paleo-Orthodoxy; theologian associated with Drew University
 J. I. Packer, theological editor for the English Standard Version, author of Knowing God
 Alvin Plantinga, University of Notre Dame, philosopher, Warrant and Christian Belief
 Frederick K. C. Price, founder and head pastor of Crenshaw Christian Center (CCC).
 Andrew Purves, Pittsburgh Theological Seminary
 Bong Rin Ro, theologian and missiologist
 Moisés Silva, former president of the Evangelical Theological Society
 R. C. Sproul, Reformed theologian, founder and chairman of Ligonier Ministries
 Elaine Storkey, British philosopher and theologian, author of numerous books on Christianity, feminism, gender, and women.
 John Stott, former Rector of All Souls Church, Langham Place
 Miroslav Volf, professor at Yale Divinity School
 Stephen H. Webb, professor at Wabash College
 Ben Witherington III, Amos professor of New Testament for Doctoral Studies at Asbury Theological Seminary and doctoral faculty at St. Andrews University
 Nicholas Wolterstorff, professor emeritus of philosophical theology, and Fellow of Berkeley College (Yale); author, Lament for a Son
 Edwin M. Yamauchi, former president of the Evangelical Theological Society
 Ravi Zacharias, apologist, author
 Dane Symonds, swinger

Pastors, preachers and evangelists 

 Leith Anderson, pastor of Wooddale Church, president of the National Association of Evangelicals
 Jim Bakker, former Assemblies of God minister, host of the PTL Club, convicted federal fraud felon, and current end-of-days evangelical preacher
 Alistair Begg, pastor of Parkside Church, radio preacher of Truth for Life
 Francis Chan, former teaching pastor of Cornerstone Community Church
 Douglas Coe, leader of the Fellowship Foundation
 Mark Dever, pastor of Capitol Hill Baptist Church, founder of 9Marks Ministries
 D. G. S. Dhinakaran, evangelical preacher, founder of Jesus Calls Ministries and the Karunya University
 Steven Furtick, founding pastor and evangelist at Elevation Church in Charlotte, NC.
 Bill Gothard, founder of the Institute in Basic Life Principles who was later removed from ministry due to sexual misconduct allegations
 Billy Graham, evangelist and spiritual counselor to multiple U.S. presidents
 Craig Groeschel, founder and pastor of Life.Church
 Nicky Gumbel, pioneer of the Alpha course and vicar of Holy Trinity Brompton in London
 John Hagee, founder and senior pastor of Cornerstone Church in San Antonio, Texas
 Ted Haggard, former pastor of New Life Church in Colorado Springs, Colorado; former leader of the National Association of Evangelicals
 Jack W. Hayford, past president of the International Church of the Foursquare Gospel
 Gordon Hugenberger, former pastor of Park Street Church
 Johnny Hunt, past president of the Southern Baptist Convention and pastor of the First Baptist Church Woodstock, Georgia
 Bill Hybels, founder and former pastor of Willow Creek Community Church
 Harry R. Jackson Jr., senior pastor at Hope Christian Church in Beltsville, Maryland and  Presiding Bishop of the International Communion of Evangelical Churches
 Peter Jensen, Anglican Archbishop of Sydney, Australia
 Phillip Jensen, Sydney Anglican
 Timothy J. Keller, pastor of Redeemer Presbyterian Church (NY City); author of The Reason for God
 Greg Laurie, pastor of Harvest Christian Fellowship and evangelist of Harvest Crusades
 Nicky Lee, creator of The Marriage Course, and associate vicar of Holy Trinity Brompton in London
 John MacArthur, pastor of Grace Community Church (California), editor of the MacArthur Study Bible, founder and president of The Master's Seminary
 James S. MacDonald (born 1960), American pastor, non-denominational Bible teacher, and author
 C. J. Mahaney, leader of Sovereign Grace Ministries
 J. Vernon McGee, pastor, Bible teacher, theologian, and radio minister
 John Piper, pastor of Bethlehem Baptist Church; author of Desiring God
 David Platt, pastor and president of the Southern Baptist Convention's International Mission Board
 Oral Roberts, founder of Oral Roberts University
 Philip Ryken, former pastor of Tenth Presbyterian Church, current president of Wheaton College
 Chuck Smith, founder of the Calvary Chapel fellowship of churches
 Andy Stanley, founder of North Point Community Church
 Charles Stanley, founder and president of In Touch Ministries
 Chuck Swindoll, pastor, founder and president of Insight for Living
 Gardner C. Taylor, known as "the dean of American preaching"
 Jack Van Impe, pastor and host of Jack Van Impe Presents
 Rick Warren, pastor of Saddleback Church, author of The Purpose Driven Life, The Purpose Driven Church
 Paul Washer, founder of HeartCry Missionary Society
 Justin Welby, Archbishop of Canterbury
 John Wimber, pastor and founder of the Association of Vineyard Churches

Authors and speakers 

 Jerry Bridges, speaker with The Navigators (organization), author of The Pursuit of Holiness
 Tony Campolo, pastor, sociologist, author, public speaker and leader of the Red-Letter Christian movement
 Shane Claiborne, writer, political activist and leader of the Red-Letter Christian movement
 Charles Colson, founder of Prison Fellowship, author of Born Again
 James Dobson, psychologist, founder of Focus on the Family, author of Dare to Discipline
 Tony Evans, widely syndicated radio broadcaster
 Alex McFarland, apologist
 Louie Giglio, speaker and founder of Passion Conferences
 Kent Hovind, dangers of evolution, scientific evidence for the Bible
 Sergei Kourdakov, former KGB agent who persecuted Christians in Russia, but converted and defected to Canada
 Tim Lahaye, dispensationalist novelist, author of Left Behind series
 Jeri Massi, author of the Christy Award-nominated Valkyries: Some Through the Fire
 Joyce Meyer, charismatic speaker, author of Battlefield of the Mind: Winning the Battle in Your Mind
 Chuck Missler, apologist, author, founder of Koinonia House Ministries
 Luis Palau, Argentinian evangelist
 Joni Eareckson Tada, author, radio host, and founder of Joni and Friends
 Jim Wallis, founder and editor of Sojourners Magazine, political activist and leader of the Red-Letter Christian movement
 David F. Wells, author of No Place for Truth or Whatever Happened to Evangelical Theology, motivator for The Cambridge Declaration
 Philip Yancey, Christianity Today editor, columnist, author of The Jesus I Never Knew and What's So Amazing About Grace
 Ed Young, writer, speaker, artist, and the founding and senior Pastor of Fellowship Church

Educators and professors 

 Darrell Bock, former president of the Evangelical Theological Society
 Don Carson, professor at Trinity Evangelical Divinity School
 Barry Corey, president of Biola University
 W. A. Criswell, former president of the Southern Baptist Convention
 Ligon Duncan, president of the Alliance of Confessing Evangelicals
 Robert Godfrey, president of Westminster Seminary California
 Kenneth E. Hagin, Charismatic preacher and founder of RHEMA Bible Training College (RBTC) 
 John D. Hannah, author and professor at Dallas Theological Seminary
 Irving Hexham, Professor of Religious Studies, University of Calgary
 D. Michael Lindsay, president of Taylor University
 R. Albert Mohler, Jr., president of Southern Baptist Theological Seminary in Louisville, Kentucky
 Richard Mouw, president of Fuller Theological Seminary
 Mark Noll, history professor at the University of Notre Dame
 Nicholas Perrin, president of Trinity International University
 Haddon Robinson, president of Gordon-Conwell Theological Seminary
 Phil Ryken, president of Wheaton College
 Klyne Snodgrass, professor at North Park Theological Seminary, author of Between Two Truths
 Chuck Swindoll, former president of Dallas Theological Seminary
 Donald Sweeting, president of Colorado Christian University
 Kevin Vanhoozer, professor at Trinity Evangelical Divinity School

Influencers and innovators 

 Howard Ahmanson, Jr., philanthropist and financier of many evangelical organizations
 George Barna, directing leader of The Barna Group, a Christian research and training organization
 Bill Bright, founder of Campus Crusade for Christ
 Loren Cunningham, founder of Youth with a Mission (YWAM) and University of the Nations
 Stuart Epperson, co-founder and chairman of Salem Communications
 Franklin Graham, son of Billy Graham and leader of Samaritan's Purse
 Chip Ingram, founder and teaching pastor of Living on the Edge
 T. D. Jakes, pastor, author, filmmaker, and bishop of The Potter's House
 Richard Land, president of the Ethics & Religious Liberty Commission
 Frank Laubach, missionary, writer, developer of the "Each One Teach One" literacy program
 Joel Osteen, pastor of Lakewood Church in Houston, Texas
 John Osteen, founder and first pastor of Lakewood Church in Houston, Texas
 Tony Perkins, political activist and president of the Family Research Council
 Pat Robertson, founder of the Christian Coalition of America
 Jay Alan Sekulow, chief counsel for the American Center for Law and Justice (ACLJ)
 Danny Yamashiro, chaplain at Massachusetts Institute of Technology, scholar on American presidents and childhood trauma

Political figures 

 John Ashcroft, former U.S. Attorney General and U.S. Senator from Missouri
 George W. Bush, former President of the United States
 Jimmy Carter, former President of the United States
 Ted Cruz, U.S. Senator from Texas
 Jim DeMint, former U.S. Senator from South Carolina
 Mike Huckabee, former Governor of Arkansas
 James Lankford, U.S. Senator from Oklahoma
 Sarah Palin, 2008 Republican vice presidential nominee and former Governor of Alaska
 Tim Pawlenty, former Governor of Minnesota 
 Mike Pence, former Vice President of the United States
 Rick Perry, former U.S. Secretary of Energy and former Governor of Texas
 Ronald Reagan, former President of the United States, who despite being a nominal mainline Protestant, became a hero of the Christian right
 Ben Sasse, U.S. Senator from Nebraska
 John Thune, U.S. Senator from South Dakota

Notes

Evangelical